The 1924 County Championship was the 31st officially organised running of the County Championship. Yorkshire County Cricket Club won the championship title for the third successive year.

Final placings were still decided by calculating the percentage of points gained against possible points available but the points for a win on first innings drawn matches reverted to three points and in a match lost to one point. The matches Warwicks vs Notts, Surrey vs Essex, Leics vs Surrey, Somerset vs Essex and Glamorgan vs Somerset were all abandoned without a ball being bowled.

Table
 Five points were awarded for a win.
 Three points were awarded for "winning" the first innings of a drawn match.
 Two points were awarded for "tying" the first innings of a drawn match.
 One points were awarded for "losing" the first innings of a drawn match.
 Final placings were decided by calculating the percentage of possible points.

References

County Championship
County Championship seasons